Anarchism has had a special interest on the issue of education from the works of William Godwin and Max Stirner onwards.

A wide diversity of issues related to education have gained the attention of anarchist theorists and activists. They have included the role of education in social control and socialization, the rights and liberties of youth and children within educational contexts, the inequalities encouraged by current educational systems, the influence of state and religious ideologies in the education of people, the division between social and manual work and its relationship with education, sex education and art education.

Various alternatives to contemporary mainstream educational systems and their problems have been proposed by anarchists which have gone from alternative education systems and environments, self-education, advocacy of youth and children rights, and freethought activism.

Early anarchist views on education

William Godwin
For English enlightenment anarchist William Godwin education was "the main means by which change would be achieved." Godwin saw that the main goal of education should be the promotion of happiness. For Godwin, education had to have "A respect for the child's autonomy which precluded any form of coercion", "A pedagogy that respected this and sought to build on the child's own motivation and initiatives" and "A concern about the child's capacity to resist an ideology transmitted through the school."

In his Political Justice, he criticizes state sponsored schooling "on account of its obvious alliance with national government." For him the State "will not fail to employ it to strengthen its hands, and perpetuate its institutions." He thought "It is not true that our youth ought to be instructed to venerate the constitution, however excellent; they should be instructed to venerate truth; and the constitution only so far as it corresponded with their independent deductions of truth." A long work on the subject of education to consider is The Enquirer.  Reflections On Education, Manners, And Literature.  In A Series Of Essays.

Max Stirner
Max Stirner was a German philosopher linked mainly with the anarchist school of thought known as individualist anarchism who worked as a schoolteacher in a gymnasium for young girls. He examines the subject of education directly in his long essay The False Principle of our Education. In it "we discern his persistent pursuit of the goal of individual self-awareness and his insistence on the centering of everything around the individual personality". As such Stirner "in education, all of the given material has value only in so far as children learn to do something with it, to use it". In that essay he deals with the debates between realist and humanistic educational  commentators and sees that both "are concerned with the learner as an object, someone to be acted upon rather than one encouraged to move toward subjective self-realization and liberation" and sees that "a knowledge which only burdens me as a belonging and a possession, instead of having gone along with me completely so that the free-moving ego, not encumbered by any dragging possessions, passes through the world with a fresh spirit, such a knowledge then, which has not become personal, furnishes a poor preparation for life".

He concludes this essay by saying that "the necessary decline of non-voluntary learning and rise of the self-assured will which perfects itself in the glorious sunlight of the free person may be expressed somewhat as follows: knowledge must die and rise again as will and create itself anew each day as a free person." Stirner thus saw education "is to be life and there, as outside of it, the self-revelation of the individual is to be the task." For him "pedagogy should not proceed any further towards civilizing, but toward the development of free men, sovereign characters".

Josiah Warren 
Josiah Warren is widely regarded as the first American anarchist. "Where utopian projectors starting with Plato entertained the idea of creating an ideal species through eugenics and education and a set of universally valid institutions inculcating shared identities, Warren wanted to dissolve such identities in a solution of individual self-sovereignty. His educational experiments, for example, possibly under the influence of the...Swiss educational theorist Johann Heinrich Pestalozzi (via Robert Owen), emphasized—as we would expect—the nurturing of the independence and the conscience of individual children, not the inculcation of pre-conceived values."

Late 19th century

Mikhail Bakunin
On "Equal Opportunity in Education" Russian anarchist Mikhail Bakunin denounced what he saw as the social inequalities caused by the current educational systems. He put this issue in this way "will it be feasible for the working masses to know complete emancipation as long as the education available to those masses continues to be inferior to that bestowed upon the bourgeois, or, in more general terms, as long as there exists any class, be it numerous or otherwise, which, by virtue of birth, is entitled to a superior education and a more complete instruction? Does not the question answer itself?..."

He also denounced that "Consequently while some study others must labour so that they can produce what we need to live — not just producing for their own needs, but also for those men who devote themselves exclusively to intellectual pursuits. As a solution to this Bakunin proposed that "Our answer to that is a simple one: everyone must work and everyone must receive education...for work's sake as much as for the sake of science, there must no longer be this division into workers and scholars and henceforth there must be only men. "

Peter Kropotkin
Russian anarcho-communist theorist Peter Kropotkin suggested in "Brain Work and Manual Work" that "The masses of the workmen do not receive more scientific education than their grandfathers did; but they have been deprived of the education of even the small workshop, while their boys and girls are driven into a mine, or a factory, from the age of thirteen, and there they soon forget the little they may have learned at school. As to the scientists, they despise manual labour." So for Kropotkin "We fully recognise the necessity of specialisation of knowledge, but we maintain that specialisation must follow general education, and that general education must be given in science and handicraft alike. To the division of society into brainworkers and manual workers we oppose the combination of both kinds of activities; and instead of 'technical education,' which means the maintenance of the present division between brain work and manual work, we advocate the éducation intégrale, or complete education, which means the disappearance of that pernicious distinction."

Early 20th century

Leo Tolstoy
The Russian christian anarchist and famous novelist Leo Tolstoy established a school for peasant children on his estate. Tolstoy returned to Yasnaya Polyana and founded thirteen schools for his serfs' children, based on the principles Tolstoy described in his 1862 essay "The School at Yasnaya Polyana". Tolstoy's educational experiments were short-lived due to harassment by the Tsarist secret police, but as a direct forerunner to A. S. Neill's Summerhill School, the school at Yasnaya Polyana can justifiably be claimed to be the first example of a coherent theory of democratic education.

Tolstoy differentiated between education and culture. He wrote that "Education is the tendency of one man to make another just like himself... Education is culture under restraint, culture is free. [Education is] when the teaching is forced upon the pupil, and when then instruction is exclusive, that is when only those subjects are taught which the educator regards as necessary". For him "without compulsion, education was transformed into culture".

Francisco Ferrer i Guàrdia and Modern schools

In 1901, Catalan anarchist and free-thinker Francisco Ferrer established "modern" or progressive schools in Barcelona in defiance of an educational system controlled by the Catholic Church. The schools' stated goal was to "educate the working class in a rational, secular and non-coercive setting". Fiercely anti-clerical, Ferrer believed in "freedom in education", education free from the authority of church and state. Murray Bookchin wrote: "This period [1890s] was the heyday of libertarian schools and pedagogical projects in all areas of the country where Anarchists exercised some degree of influence. Perhaps the best-known effort in this field was Francisco Ferrer's Modern School (Escuela Moderna), a project which exercised a considerable influence on Catalan education and on experimental techniques of teaching generally." La Escuela Moderna, and Ferrer's ideas generally, formed the inspiration for a series of Modern Schools in the United States, Cuba, South America and London. The first of these was started in New York City in 1911. It also inspired the Italian newspaper Università popolare, founded in 1901.

Ferrer wrote an extensive work on education and on his educational experiments called The Origin and Ideals of the Modern School.

The Modern School movement in the United States 

The Modern Schools, also called Ferrer Schools, were United States schools, established in the early twentieth century, that were modeled after the Escuela Moderna of Francisco Ferrer, the Catalan educator and anarchist. They were an important part of the anarchist, free schooling, socialist, and labor movements in the U.S., intended to educate the working-classes from a secular, class-conscious perspective. The Modern Schools imparted day-time academic classes for children, and night-time continuing-education lectures for adults.

The first, and most notable, of the Modern Schools was founded in New York City, in 1911, two years after Francisco Ferrer i Guàrdia's execution for sedition in monarchist Spain on 18 October 1909. Commonly called the Ferrer Center, it was founded by notable anarchists — including Leonard Abbott, Alexander Berkman, Voltairine de Cleyre, and Emma Goldman — first meeting on St. Mark's Place, in Manhattan's Lower East Side, but twice moved elsewhere, first within lower Manhattan, then to Harlem. The Ferrer Center opened with only nine students, one being the son of Margaret Sanger, the contraceptives-rights activist. Starting in 1912, the school's principal was the philosopher Will Durant, who also taught there. Besides Berkman and Goldman, the Ferrer Center faculty included the Ashcan School painters Robert Henri and George Bellows, and its guest lecturers included writers and political activists such as Margaret Sanger, Jack London, and Upton Sinclair. Student Magda Schoenwetter, recalled that the school used Montessori methods and equipment, and emphasised academic freedom rather than fixed subjects, such as spelling and arithmetic. The Modern School magazine originally began as a newsletter for parents, when the school was in New York City, printed with the manual printing press used in teaching printing as a profession. After moving to the Stelton Colony, New Jersey, the magazine's content expanded to poetry, prose, art, and libertarian education articles; the cover emblem and interior graphics were designed by Rockwell Kent. Artists and writers, among them Hart Crane and Wallace Stevens, praised The Modern School as "the most beautifully printed magazine in existence."

After the 4 July 1914 Lexington Avenue bombing, the police investigated and several times raided the Ferrer Center and other labor and anarchist organisations in New York City. Acknowledging the urban danger to their school, the organizers bought 68 acres (275,000 m2) in Piscataway Township, New Jersey, and moved there in 1914, becoming the center of the Stelton Colony. Moreover, beyond New York City, the Ferrer Colony and Modern School was founded (–1915) as a Modern School-based community, that endured some forty years. In 1933, James and Nellie Dick, who earlier had been principals of the Stelton Modern School, founded the Modern School in Lakewood, New Jersey, which survived the original Modern School, the Ferrer Center, becoming the final surviving such school, lasting until 1958.

Late 20th century to present

Experiments in Germany led to A. S. Neill founding what became Summerhill School in 1921. Summerhill is often cited as an example of anarchism in practice. British anarchists Stuart Christie and Albert Meltzer manifested that "A.S. Neill is the modern pioneer of libertarian education and of "hearts not heads in the school". Although he has denied being an anarchist, it would be hard to know how else to describe his philosophy, though he is correct in recognising the difference between revolution in philosophy and pedagogy, and the revolutionary change of society. They are associated but not the same thing." However, although Summerhill and other free schools are radically libertarian, they differ in principle from those of Ferrer by not advocating an overtly political class struggle-approach.

Herbert Read 
The English anarchist philosopher, art critic and poet, Herbert Read developed a strong interest in the subject of education and particularly in art education. Read's anarchism was influenced by William Godwin, Peter Kropotkin and Max Stirner. Read "became deeply interested in children's drawings and paintings after having been invited to collect works for an exhibition of British art that would tour allied and neutral countries during the Second World War. As it was considered too risky to transport across the Atlantic works of established importance to the national heritage, it was proposed that children's drawings and paintings should be sent instead. Read, in making his collection, was unexpectedly moved by the expressive power and emotional content of some of the younger artist's works. The experience prompted his special attention to their cultural value, and his engagement of the theory of children's creativity with seriousness matching his devotion to the avant-garde. This work both changed fundamentally his own life's work throughout his remaining twenty-five years and provided art education with a rationale of unprecedented lucidity and persuasiveness. Key books and pamphlets resulted: Education through Art (Read, 1943); The Education of Free Men (Read, 1944); Culture and Education in a World Order (Read, 1948); The Grass Read, (1955); and Redemption of the Robot (1970)".

Read "elaborated a socio-cultural dimension of creative education, offering the notion of greater international understanding and cohesiveness rooted in principles of developing the fully balanced personality through art education. Read argued in Education through Art that "every child, is said to be a potential neurotic capable of being saved from this prospect, if early, largely inborn, creative abilities were not repressed by conventional Education. Everyone is an artist of some kind whose special abilities, even if almost insignificant, must be encouraged as contributing to an infinite richness of collective life. Read's newly expressed view of an essential 'continuity' of
child and adult creativity in everyone represented a  synthesis' the two opposed models of twentieth-century art education that had predominated until this point...Read did not offer a curriculum but a theoretical defence of the genuine and true. His claims for genuineness and truth were based on the overwhelming evidence of characteristics revealed in his study of child art...From 1946 until his death in 1968 he was president of the Society for Education in Art (SEA), the renamed ATG, in which capacity he had a platform for addressing UNESCO...On the basis of such representation Read, with others, succeeded in establishing the International Society for Education through Art (INSEA)
as an executive arm of UNESCO in 1954.""

Paul Goodman
Paul Goodman was an important anarchist critic of contemporary educational systems as can be seen in his books  Growing Up Absurd and Compulsory Mis-education. Goodman believed that in contemporary societies "It is in the schools and from the mass media, rather than at home or from their friends, that the mass of our citizens in all classes learn that life is inevitably routine, depersonalized, venally graded; that it is best to toe the mark and shut up; that there is no place for spontaneity, open sexuality and free spirit. Trained in the schools they go on to the same quality of jobs, culture and politics. This is education, miseducation socializing to the national norms and regimenting to the nation's "needs".

Goodman thought that a person's most valuable educational experiences  Goodman wrote of his contemporaneous 1960s American schooling: "The basic intention behind the compulsory attendance laws is not only to insure the socialization process but also to control the labour supply quantitatively within an industrialized economy characterized by unemployment and inflation. The public schools and universities have become large holding tanks of potential workers."

Ivan Illich
The term deschooling was popularized by Ivan Illich, who argued that the school as an institution is dysfunctional for self-determined learning and serves the creation of a consumer society instead. Illich thought that "the dismantling of the public education system would coincide with a pervasive abolition of all the suppressive institutions of society". Illich "charges public schooling with institutionalizing acceptable moral and behavioral standards and with constitutionally violating the rights of young adults."  IIlich subscribes to Goodman's belief that most
of the useful education that people acquire is a by-product of work or leisure and not of the school. Illich refers to this process as "informal education". Only through this unrestricted and unregulated form of learning can the individual
gain a sense of self-awareness and develop his creative capacity to its fullest extent." Illich thought that the main goals of an alternative education systems should be "to provide access to available resources to all who want to learn: to empower
all who want to share what they know; to find those who want to learn it from them; to furnish all who want to present an issue to the public with the opportunity to make their challenges known. The system of learning webs is aimed at individual freedom and expression in education by using society as the classroom. There would be reference services to index items available for study in laboratories, theatres, airports, libraries, etc.; skill exchanges which would permit people to list their skills so that potential students could contact them; peer-matching, which would communicate an individual's interest so that he or she could find educational associates; reference services to educators at large, which would be a central directory of professionals, para professionals and freelancers."

Colin Ward 
English anarchist Colin Ward in his main theoretical publication Anarchy in Action (1973) in a chapter called "Schools No Longer" "discusses the genealogy of education and schooling, in particular examining the writings of Everett Reimer and Ivan Illich, and the beliefs of anarchist educator Paul Goodman.  Many of Colin's writings in the 1970s, in particular Streetwork: The Exploding School (1973, with Anthony Fyson), focused on learning practices and spaces outside of the school building. In introducing Streetwork, Ward writes, "[this] is a book about ideas: ideas of the environment as the educational resource, ideas of the enquiring school, the school without walls..." In the same year, Ward contributed to Education Without Schools (edited by Peter Buckman) discussing 'the role of the state'.  He argued that "one significant role of the state in the national education systems of the world is to perpetuate social and economic injustice"".

In The Child in the City (1978), and later The Child in the Country (1988), Ward "examined the everyday spaces of young people's lives and how they can negotiate and re-articulate the various environments they inhabit. In his earlier text, the more famous of the two, Colin Ward explores the creativity and uniqueness of children and how they cultivate 'the art of making the city work'. He argued that through play, appropriation and imagination, children can counter adult-based intentions and interpretations of the built environment.  His later text, The Child in the Country, inspired a number of social scientists, notably geographer Chris Philo (1992), to call for more attention to be paid to young people as a 'hidden' and marginalised group in society."

See also
Anarchistic free school
Alternative education
Democratic education

References

Bibliography

External links

Anarchist texts on education at the Anarchist Library

 
Education policy
Alternative education
Anarchist theory